James Alfred Perkins (October 11, 1911 – August 19, 1998) was the seventh president of Cornell University, from 1963 to 1969.

Biography 
Perkins was born in 1911 in Philadelphia, graduated with honors in 1934 from Swarthmore College, and received a doctorate in political science from Princeton University in 1937. At Swarthmore, Perkins joined the Delta Upsilon Fraternity and played varsity football alongside his classmate, DU brother and future 1972 Nobel Prize laureate Christian B. Anfinsen. From 1937 to 1941 he was a faculty member at Princeton. After service in the Office of Price Administration and the Foreign Economic Administration during World War II, he was vice president of Swarthmore from 1945 to 1950.

In 1950 he joined the Carnegie Corporation, an educational foundation. In 1951–1952, on leave from there, he served as deputy chairman of the Research and Development Board of the Department of Defense. In addition while at Carnegie he chaired President Kennedy's Advisory Panel on a National Academy of Foreign Affairs, sat on the General Advisory Committee of the Arms Control and Disarmament Agency, the U.S. Committee for UNESCO, and the Board of Trustees of the RAND Corporation, and headed the Rockefeller Brothers Fund committee that produced the report The Power of the Democratic Idea.

Perkins served as president of Cornell from October 4, 1963, until his resignation on May 31, 1969, in the wake of the occupation of Willard Straight Hall by armed African American students. In 1995 Thomas W. Jones, a trustee of the university who had been a leader of the building occupation, established the James A. Perkins Prize for Interracial Understanding and Harmony in his name.

He was a member of the Carnegie Commission on Higher Education from 1967 to 1973, and after leaving Cornell, founded the International Council for Educational Development in Princeton, New Jersey. In 1978 he was appointed chairman of President Carter's Commission on Foreign Language and International Studies. He was a member of the Steering Committee of the Bilderberg Group.

Perkins' publications include The University in Transition (1966), a series of three lectures in which he argued that a university must balance its three missions of research, teaching, and public service. He died in Burlington, Vermont, of complications after a fall while in the Adirondacks.

In popular culture 
In an episode of The Office, Andy Bernard mentions Perkins during a Cornell admissions interview of coworker Dwight.

Notes

Further reading

External links
 Cornell Presidency: James A. Perkins
 Cornell University Library Presidents Exhibition: James Alfred Perkins (Presidency; Inauguration)

1911 births
1998 deaths
Members of the Steering Committee of the Bilderberg Group
Presidents of Cornell University
Princeton University alumni
Princeton University faculty
Swarthmore College alumni
Swarthmore Garnet Tide football players
American political scientists
American Quakers
Educators from Philadelphia
20th-century Quakers
20th-century American academics
20th-century political scientists